Andrei Alexandrovich Kuzmenko (born February 4, 1996) is a Russian professional ice hockey player currently playing for the Vancouver Canucks of the National Hockey League (NHL).

Playing career
Kuzmenko made his Kontinental Hockey League debut playing with HC CSKA Moscow during the 2014–15 KHL season. In the 2017–18 season, Kuzmenko broke out as a 21-year old establishing career bests of 13 goals and 25 points in 45 games with CSKA. In helping the club reach the Gagarin Cup finals, he produced 4 goals in 15 games.

Approaching the 2018–19 season, Kuzmenko was traded by CSKA to fellow contending club, SKA Saint Petersburg in exchange for Sergey Kalinin on August 8, 2018.

In his fourth year with SKA in the 2021–22 season, Kuzmenko increased his offensive output to over a point-per-game leading SKA in scoring with 20 goals and 33 assists for 53 points in 45 regular season games. He led the team in the post-season, continuing his scoring pace with 14 points in as many contests before losing in the Conference finals to eventual champions and former club, CSKA Moscow.

As an undrafted free agent and having gained NHL interest, on 20 June 2022, Kuzmenko was signed to a one-year, entry-level contract with the Vancouver Canucks. He made his NHL debut on 13 October 2022 where he scored a goal in the eventual 5–3 loss to the Edmonton Oilers. He continued to produce steadily through the early parts of the season; on 3 November, he recorded his first career NHL hat-trick in a four-point game, as the Canucks took an 8–5 victory over the Anaheim Ducks. By this time, Kuzmenko had tallied six goals and four assists for 10 points through 11 games.

Establishing himself as one of the Canucks top offensive contributors, Kuzmenko as an impending free agent opted to remain with the Canucks in signing a two-year, $11 million contract extension on 26 January 2023.

Career statistics

Regular season and playoffs

International

References

External links

1996 births
Living people
HC CSKA Moscow players
People from Yakutsk
Russian ice hockey left wingers
SKA Saint Petersburg players
Sportspeople from Sakha
Undrafted National Hockey League players
Vancouver Canucks players
Zvezda Chekhov players